Senator Hirsch may refer to:

Joseph J. Hirsch (1888–1960), Wisconsin State Senate
Solomon Hirsch (1839–1902), Oregon State Senate

See also
Omer L. Hirst (1913–2003), Virginia State Senate